Viktor Stepanovich Chernomyrdin (9 April 19383 November 2010) was a Soviet and Russian politician and businessman. He was the Minister of Gas Industry of the Soviet Union (13 February 1985 – 17 July 1989), after which he became first chairman of Gazprom energy company and the second-longest-serving Prime Minister of Russia (1992–1998) based on consecutive years. He was a key figure in Russian politics in the 1990s and a participant in the transition from a planned to a market economy. From 2001 to 2009, he was Russia's ambassador to Ukraine. After that, he was designated as a presidential adviser.

Chernomyrdin was known in Russia and Russian-speaking countries for his language style, which contained numerous malapropisms and syntactic errors. Many of his sayings became aphorisms and idioms in the Russian language, one example being the expression "We wanted the best, but it turned out like always.".

Chernomyrdin died on 3 November 2010 after a long illness. He was buried beside his wife in Novodevichy Cemetery on 5 November, and his funeral was broadcast live on Russian federal TV channels.

Early life and education
Chernomyrdin was born in Chernyi Otrog, Orenburg Oblast, Russian SFSR. His father was a labourer and Viktor was one of five children. Chernomyrdin completed school education in 1957 and found employment as a mechanic in an oil refinery in Orsk. He worked there until 1962, except for his military service from 1957 to 1960. His other occupations on the plant during this period included machinist, operator and chief of technical installations.

He became a member of the CPSU in 1961. In 1962, he was admitted to Kuybyshev Industrial Institute (which was later renamed Samara Polytechnical Institute). In his entrance exams he performed very poorly. He failed the maths sections of the test and had to take the exam again, getting a C. He got only one B, in Russian language, and Cs in the other tests. He was admitted only because of very poor competition. In 1966, he graduated from the institute. In 1972, he completed further studies at the Department of Economics of the Union-wide Polytechnic Institute by correspondence.

Early career
Chernomyrdin began developing his career as a politician when he worked for the CPSU in Orsk between 1967 and 1973. In 1973, he was appointed the director of the natural gas refining plant in Orenburg, a position which he held until 1978. Between 1978 and 1982, Chernomyrdin worked in the heavy industry arm of the CPSU Central Committee.

In 1982, he was appointed deputy Minister of the natural gas industries of the Soviet Union. Concurrently, beginning from 1983, he directed Glavtyumengazprom, an industry association for natural gas resource development in Tyumen Oblast. During 1985–1989 he was the minister of gas industries.

Founder of Gazprom
In August 1989, under the leadership of Chernomyrdin, the Ministry of Gas Industry was transformed into the State Gas Concern, Gazprom, which became the country's first state-corporate enterprise. Chernomyrdin was elected its first chairman. The company was still controlled by the state, but now the control was exercised through shares of stock, 100% of which were owned by the state.

When the Soviet Union dissolved in late 1991, assets of the former Soviet state in the gas sector were transferred to newly created national companies such as Ukrgazprom and Turkmengazprom. Gazprom kept assets located in the territory of Russia, and was able to secure a monopoly in the gas sector.

Gazprom's political influence increased markedly after Russian President Boris Yeltsin appointed the company's chairman Chernomyrdin as his Prime Minister in 1992. Rem Viakhirev took Chernomyrdin's place as chairman both of the board of directors and of the managing committee. Gazprom was one of the backbones of the country's economy in 1990s, though the company underperformed during that decade. In the 2000s, however, Gazprom became the largest extractor of natural gas in the world and the largest Russian company.

Prime Minister of Russia
In May 1992, Boris Yeltsin appointed Chernomyrdin as Deputy Prime Minister in charge of fuel and energy. On 14 December 1992, Chernomyrdin was confirmed by the VII Congress of People's Deputies of Russia as Prime Minister.

According to Felipe Turover Chudínov, who was a senior intelligence officer with the foreign-intelligence directorate of the KGB, Chernomyrdin secretly decreed in the early 1990s that Russia would become an international hub for narcotics trafficking including importing cocaine and heroin from South America and heroin from Central Asia and Southeast Asia and exporting narcotics to Europe, North America including the United States and Canada, and China and the Pacific Rim.

While he had been critical of his predecessor Gaidar, Chernomyrdin largely continued Gaidar's policies.

In April 1995, he formed a political bloc called Our Home – Russia, which won 10% of the vote and 55 seats to come third in the 1995 Russian legislative election.

In 1995, Chernomyrdin signed a decree calling for the development of a national strategy for tiger conservation

On 18 June 1995, as a result of Shamil Basayev-led terrorists taking over 1500 people hostage in Budyonnovsk, negotiations between Chernomyrdin and Basayev led to a compromise which became a turning point for the First Chechen War. In exchange for the hostages, the Russian government agreed to halt military actions in Chechnya and begin a series of negotiations.

When Boris Yeltsin was undergoing a heart operation on 6 November 1996, Chernomyrdin served as Acting President for 23 hours.

Chernomyrdin remained Prime Minister until his sudden dismissal on 23 March 1998. Following the 1998 Russian financial crisis in August, Yeltsin re-appointed Chernomyrdin as Prime Minister, and attempted to groom him as his successor. However, the Duma twice refused to confirm Chernomyrdin as the head of the government. Rather than risking a third rejection and thus forcing the dissolution of the State Duma and political crisis, Chernomyrdin withdrew his nomination and the President asked the more popular Yevgeny Primakov to form a new cabinet.

Diplomatic career

During the NATO bombing of Yugoslavia in 1999 Chernomyrdin was a special representative of Russia in Yugoslavia.

In December 1999 Chernomyrdin was elected a member of the State Duma. In May 2001, Vladimir Putin appointed Chernomyrdin Ambassador of Russia to Ukraine. This action was interpreted by some Russian media agencies as a move to distance Chernomyrdin from the centre of Russian politics. In 2003, he dismissed talk of an apology for the Holodomor Famine made by the Soviet Union.

In February 2009 Chernomyrdin again strained the relations between Ukraine and Russia when he in an interview said "It is impossible to come to an agreement on anything with the Ukrainian leadership. If different people come in, we'll see". The Ukrainian foreign ministry said in a response it could declare Chernomyrdin "persona non-grata" over the row.

On 11 June 2009, Russian President Dmitry Medvedev relieved Chernomyrdin as Russian Ambassador in Kyiv, and appointed him as "presidential adviser and special presidential representative on economic cooperation with CIS member countries". In a parting shot at the Ukrainian government, Chernomyrdin stated that Russia should not apologise to Ukraine over voicing its suspicions about Ukraine being unable to pay for its natural gas, and further stated that Russia wants Ukraine to pay for the gas it consumes, and hence Russia is right to be concerned about the solvency of the Ukrainian state.

Death

Chernomyrdin died on the morning of 3 November 2010 after a long illness. According to people close to Chernomyrdin, such as singer Lev Leshchenko, the former Prime Minister was deeply affected by the death of his wife Valentina, seven and a half months earlier.

Chernomyrdin was buried beside his wife in Novodevichy Cemetery on 5 November 2010. On 3 November Russian President Dmitry Medvedev signed an order to show Chernomyrdin's funeral in a live broadcast on Russian federal TV channels (only the funerals of the former President Boris Yeltsin and Patriarch Alexy II were granted the same right in recent years). The head of the Presidential Administration of Russia, Sergey Naryshkin, supervised the funeral ceremony.
 
Condolences on the death of Chernomyrdin were voiced on 3 November 2010 by Russian President Dmitry Medvedev, Russian Prime Minister Vladimir Putin, other state figures in Russia and Ukrainian President Viktor Yanukovich.

Sayings 

In Russian-speaking countries, Chernomyrdin is known for his numerous malapropisms and syntactically incorrect speech, somewhat similar to Irish bulls. His idioms received the name Chernomyrdinki, and are somewhat comparable to Bushisms in style and effect. One of his expressions "We wanted it as good as possible, but it turned out as always" (Хотели как лучше, а получилось как всегда in Russian) about the economic reforms in Russia was widely quoted (sometimes rendered in English as "We wanted the best, you know the rest" or "We tried our best, you know the rest.") The phrase was uttered after a highly unsuccessful monetary exchange performed by the Russian Central Bank in July 1993.

Honours and awards
State awards of the Russian Federation and USSR
 Order of Merit for the Fatherland
1st class (24 March 2009) – for outstanding contribution to strengthening the international prestige of the Russian Federation and many years of fruitful activity
2nd class (23 March 1998) – for outstanding contribution to the development of the Russian state
3rd class (9 April 2008) – for outstanding contribution to the development of Russian-Ukrainian relations
4th class (9 April 2010) – for long-term fruitful state activity
 Order of Friendship (8 April 2003) – for outstanding contribution to the strengthening and development of friendship and cooperation between Russia and Ukraine
 Order of the October Revolution (1986)
 Order of the Red Banner of Labour (1979)
 Order of the Badge of Honour (1974) – for achievements in the construction and development of the design capacity of the first stage of Orenburg gas complex
 Jubilee Medal "300 Years of the Russian Navy" (7 June 1996)
 Medal "In Commemoration of the 850th Anniversary of Moscow" (6 September 1997)
 Medal "In Commemoration of the 1000th Anniversary of Kazan" (23 August 2005)
 Jubilee Medal "In Commemoration of the 100th Anniversary since the Birth of Vladimir Il'ich Lenin" (1970)
 Jubilee Medal "Forty Years of Victory in the Great Patriotic War 1941-1945" (1985)

President and the Government of the Russian Federation
 Diploma of the President of the Russian Federation (12 December 2008) – for active participation in the drafting of the Constitution and a great contribution to the democratic foundations of the Russian Federation
 Gratitude of the President of the Russian Federation (9 November 1993)
 Gratitude of the President of the Russian Federation (14 August 1995) – for active participation in the preparation and conduct of the 50th anniversary of Victory in Great Patriotic War of 1941–1945
 Gratitude of the President of the Russian Federation (12 July 1996) – for active participation in organizing and conducting the election campaign of President of Russian Federation in 1996
 Gratitude of the President of the Russian Federation (30 July 1999) – for his great personal contribution to a political settlement between the Federal Republic of Yugoslavia and NATO, consistent defense of Russia's position in the Balkans
 Diploma of the Russian Federation Government (9 April 2003) – for his great personal contribution to the development of Russian-Ukrainian trade and economic cooperation
 Diploma of the Russian Federation Government (9 April 2008) – for long-term fruitful state activity

Foreign awards
 Medal "100th Anniversary of Birth of Georgi Dimitrov" (People's Republic of Bulgaria, 1982)
 Mkhitar Gosh (Armenia, 4 December 1998) – for outstanding contribution to the elimination of the consequences of the Spitak earthquake, humanitarian assistance and reconstruction work. Medal awarded 18 April 2002
 Order of Parasat (Kazakhstan, 1 September 1999) – for his contribution to the development of oil and gas industry in Kazakhstan
 Order of Prince Yaroslav the Wise, 5th class (Ukraine, 8 April 2003) – for outstanding contribution to the development of bilateral relations between Russia and Ukraine, weighty personal contribution in strengthening the friendly ties between the Russian and Ukrainian peoples
 Order of Merit, 3rd class (Ukraine, 17 June 2009) – for his contribution to the development of Ukrainian-Russian relations, the long-term diplomatic activity

Awards of states of the Russian Federation
 Order "For Merit" (Republic of Ingushetia, 19 June 2001) – for outstanding contribution to the establishment and development of the economy of Ingushetia
 Order of the "Key of Friendship" (Kemerovo Region, 7 March 2008)

Faith awards
 Order of St. Sergius, 2nd class (Russian Orthodox Church, 29 March 2007) – for their efforts in strengthening the unity of Orthodox peoples
 Order of Christmas, 2nd class (UOC)
 Jubilee medal "1020 years of the Baptism of Kievan Rus" (PCM, 25 November 2008)

Departmental awards
 Honorary Worker of the Ministry for Oil and Gas Construction (1 April 1988)
 Veteran of Labour in the Gas Industry (8 April 1998)
 Honorary Worker of the Ministry of Foreign Affairs (2 April 2003) – for active participation in the implementation of Russian foreign policy

Other recognitions
 A Russian icebreaker is named after Chernomyrdin

References

External links

Viktor Stepanovich Chernomyrdin from The Columbia Encyclopedia, Sixth Edition 2007, and related articles
Man in the News; Kremlin's Technocrat: Viktor Stepanovich Chernomyrdin By Steven Erlanger The New York Times 15 December 1992.
 
 

|-

1938 births
2010 deaths
20th-century presidents of Russia
People from Orenburg Oblast
Central Committee of the Communist Party of the Soviet Union members
Our Home – Russia politicians
United Russia politicians
21st-century Russian politicians
Acting presidents of Russia
Heads of government of the Russian Federation
Deputy heads of government of the Russian Federation
Acting prime ministers of the Russian Federation
Medvedev Administration personnel
Third convocation members of the State Duma (Russian Federation)
Ambassador Extraordinary and Plenipotentiary (Russian Federation)
Ambassadors of Russia to Ukraine
Gazprom people
Full Cavaliers of the Order "For Merit to the Fatherland"
Recipients of the Order of Prince Yaroslav the Wise
Recipients of the Order of Merit (Ukraine), 3rd class
Recipients of the Order of Parasat
Deaths from cancer in Russia
Burials at Novodevichy Cemetery
20th-century Russian politicians
Russian political party founders